Roy Eric Arthur Rawlings (28 January 1921 – 18 March 2014) was an Australian rules footballer who played with Footscray in the Victorian Football League (VFL).

Notes

External links 		
		
		
	
			
1921 births
2014 deaths		
Australian rules footballers from Victoria (Australia)		
Western Bulldogs players
Yarraville Football Club players
Australian Army personnel of World War II
Australian Army soldiers